Finger Print is a 2005 Indian Malayalam thriller film directed by Satheesh Paul and scripted by Siddique. The film is produced by Sabu Cherian under the banner Anandabhairavi. It stars Jayaram, Indrajith Renji V Nair and Gopika in lead roles. The film released on 18 February 2005.

Plot
A patriarch of a royal family whose descendant was murdered, assigns the task of finding the culprit to two of his police officer nephews - Vivek (Jayaram) and Kishore (Indrajith). The officers use their intelligence and expertise to track and find the culprit.

Cast

Jayaram as A.S.P Vivek Shankar IPS
Indrajith as A.S.P Kishore Varma IPS
Gopika as Preethi Varma
Nedumudi Venu as Rama Varma Thampuran
Sai Kumar as Prathapa Varma
 Unni Shivapal as Krishna Prasad
 Rajesh Subrahmanian as Devraj 
 Ranjith Velayudhan as Capt. Nandakumar
Kripa as Deepa Nair
Joju George as C.I. Shekhar
 A. T. Jose as I.G
Siraj as S.I Shereef
Devan as Adv.Murali Mohan 
 Murali Menon as Praveen Varma
Narayanankutty as Kunjikuttan Thampuran
Tom George Kolath as Medical Police Surgeon

References

2005 films
2000s Malayalam-language films